Ousmane Diabaté (born 9 July 1994) is a Nigerien professional footballer who plays as a midfielder for Al-Minaa and the Niger national football team.

Club career
On 23 January 2022, Diabaté joined Iraqi club Al-Minaa from Qatari club Muaither.

International career
Diabaté made his professional debut for the Niger national football team in a friendly 3-3 tie with the Central African Republic on 27 May 2018.

References

External links
 
 
 

1994 births
Living people
People from Niamey
Nigerien footballers
Niger international footballers
Stade Malien players
ENPPI SC players
Al Batin FC players
Jeddah Club players
Al-Taqadom FC players
Naft Maysan FC players
Muaither SC players
Al-Mina'a SC players
Malian Première Division players
Egyptian Premier League players
Saudi Professional League players
Saudi First Division League players
Iraqi Premier League players
Qatari Second Division players
Association football midfielders
Nigerien expatriate footballers
Expatriate footballers in Mali
Expatriate footballers in Ivory Coast
Expatriate footballers in Saudi Arabia
Expatriate footballers in Egypt
Expatriate footballers in Iraq
Expatriate footballers in Qatar
Nigerien expatriate sportspeople in Mali
Nigerien expatriate sportspeople in Saudi Arabia
Nigerien expatriate sportspeople in Ivory Coast
Nigerien expatriate sportspeople in Egypt